(born August 16, 1993), known professionally as , is a Japanese pornographic film actress and singer. She debuted as a member of the idol group SKE48 in 2009 before leaving in 2014. She entered the adult entertainment industry in 2015 under the Muteki label and became one of the most popular and best-selling contemporary AV idols, winning several awards in the process. Mikami is currently performing under the S1 No. 1 Style label and has appeared in over 200 adult films (including compilations and VR-based AV's as well).

Apart from performing in adult films, Mikami also remained active as a singer and idol. She is a member of the idol groups Ebisu Muscats since 2015 and Honey Popcorn since 2018. She also appears in the video games Yakuza 6 and Yakuza Kiwami 2.

Career

2006–2014: Early life and traditional idol debut 

Mikami was born as Momona Kitō on August 16, 1993 in Nagoya. At the age of 13, Mikami auditioned for Morning Musume's 8th generation in 2006, but was eliminated during the first round. In March 2009, she debuted as a second generation member of the idol group SKE48 on Team E. Her career in SKE48 saw numerous setbacks, including a demotion to kenkyuusei (trainee) status in December 2010, as well as an underage drinking/dating scandal that broke out in July 2013. On March 16, 2014, she announced her graduation from the group and her last performance with the group was on April 9, 2014. During her tenure, she appeared in eight B-side singles with SKE, as well as an appearance on the sister group AKB48's B-side single "Ano Hi no Fūrin".

2015–present: AV debut, return to music and AV retirement 

On June 1, 2015, she debuted in the adult entertainment industry under the name Yua Mikami with her first video, Princess Peach, produced by Muteki, a label that specialized on the adult film debuts for former gravure idols and minor celebrities. While Mikami originally planned it as a one-film career, Princess Peach turned out to be a huge success, becoming one of Muteki's highest selling film and one of the highest selling AV's of 2015. The unexpected positive reaction of her debut motivated Mikami to remain in the industry as an active performer. On November 12, 2015, she launched her official website. Her Twitter, and Instagram accounts were also created on the same day. In an interview, Mikami stated: "I entered the world of AV without consulting with anyone. It is my life, so I have to choose for myself."

Her second AV, Pleasure was released on January 1, 2016. Mikami's first titles were under the Muteki label (becoming one of a few AV actresses who done more than one title under the studio), before transferring to S1 No. 1 Style in November 2016. On May 13, 2016, Mikami won her first major award at the 2016 DMM Adult Awards at the "Best New Actress" category presented to her by fellow AV actress Moe Amatsuka. On April 13, 2016, she joined the Ebisu Muscats as a second-generation member. She was the event campaign girl for the National Fan Thanksgiving Festival 2016 along with Hibiki Ōtsuki.

Mikami's popularity continued to grow, as she became one of S1's "flagship" actresses, with her films regularly appearing on the best selling charts. In 2018, when Fanza did a research on the Top 10 highest selling AV actresses of the year, Mikami came out at No. 8 at digital downloads and No. 5 at physical DVD/Blu-Ray sales. Mikami won her second major award, at the "Best Actress" category in the 2017 DMM Adult Awards. She also presented the "Best New Actress" award to former gravure idol and debuting AV actress Shoko Takahashi. With both of them debuting at Muteki and being Nagoya-based, Mikami and Takahashi formed a close friendship and started to appear in the variety show "SHOW YOUR ROCKETS". For Muteki's tenth anniversary, the pair appeared in their first joint AV-title, These Two Have No Equal released on December 1, 2018. The four-hour-long film was also accompanied by a two-hour-long VR-based adult release. It also became the second best-selling Japanese adult film of 2018.

Mikami also appeared in S1's 15th-anniversary special, along with the studio's other exclusive performers: Tsukasa Aoi, Ayami Shunka, Moe Amatsuka, Arina Hashimoto, Usa Miharu, and Nene Yoshitaka. Mikami currently continues her AV career at S1 and appeared in over 200 titles so far. In 2019 and 2020, according to Fanza, she became the second highest selling AV actress of the year next to Yui Hatano and popular industry newcomer Ichika Matsumoto.  In 2021, she reached the number one position, solidifying Mikami's status, as Japan's most popular adult performer.

Despite mainly being an adult performer, Mikami stayed close to her musical roots. On November 22, 2016, she released a solo single, "Ribbon". In 2018, she debuted as a member of the South Korean-based idol group Honey Popcorn with AV idols Moko Sakura and Miko Matsuda. The group was funded by Mikami herself as a passion project. However the group's debut proved to be controversial due to the member's line of work which went against the "pure" image associated with Korean idols. The group was forced to cancel their debut concert due to the outrage and a petition with over 50,000 signatures was passed to the Blue House, demanding the group's ban. Due to the intense backlash Matsuda left Honey Popcorn in December 2018, but Mikami managed to revive the group with three new members, and they released their second EP, De-aeseohsta in July 2019.

In 2017, she was crowned the Best Actress at the DMM Adult Awards, which marked her last appearance at a major industry-related event.

In the same year, Mikami also started her own clothing brand, "YOUR'S" (later rebranded as "miyour's"), a career choice largely inspired by her close friend and AV idol Kirara Asuka. On June 27, 2020, Mikami guest starred in Malaysian singer-songwriter Namewee's new music video titled "I Shot You". The video gained 1.4 million views in just over a day.

In June 2022 on the seventh anniversary of her debut, Mikami announced her separation from her representative office One's Double and the establishment of her own  "Miss Co., Ltd." in January of the same year, allowing management independecy for Mikami. Her AV activities will continue in a business alliance with One's Double with the possibility of collaborating with other studios. 

On March 13, 2023, Mikami announced her retirement from the AV industry on her 30th birthday, August 16, 2023 through her YouTube video.

Personal life

In July 2013, while she was a member of SKE48, Shūkan Bunshun published pictures of her kissing Yuya Tegoshi, while being allegedly drunk, and staying overnight at his house in May 2013. It caused an uproar, as Mikami was pictured with alcohol and had been under the legal drinking age at that time.

Filmography

Television 
She has produced over 150 adult films to date, a large number of them under S1 No. 1 Style.

Adult films

Discography

Singles with SKE48

Singles with AKB48

Awards 
 On March 3, 2016, she received the Best Works and FLASH award from Adult Broadcasting Awards.
 On April 23, 2017, she received the Best Actress Award from DMM Adult Award.

References

External links 
 
 Ebisu Muscats Profile

1993 births
People from Nagoya
Japanese pornographic film actresses
Living people
Japanese idols
Ebisu Muscats
SKE48 members